Etti Kagarov (born 28 January 1956 in Kohtla-Järve) is an Estonian politician. She was a member of XII and XIII Riigikogu.

She was a member of the People's Union of Estonia from 2000 until 2010, and has been a member of Estonian Social Democratic Party since 2011. From 2003 until 2014, she was the Mayor of Kohtla Parish, Since 2018, she has been the director of the Estonian Mining Museum.

References

Living people
1956 births
People's Union of Estonia politicians
Social Democratic Party (Estonia) politicians
Members of the Riigikogu, 2011–2015
Members of the Riigikogu, 2015–2019
Women members of the Riigikogu
Mayors of places in Estonia
Tallinn University alumni
People from Kohtla-Järve
21st-century Estonian women politicians